The 2011 Coke Zero 400 Powered by Coca-Cola was a NASCAR Sprint Cup Series stock car race that was held on July 2, 2011 at Daytona International Speedway in Daytona Beach, Florida.  Contested over 160 laps on the  asphalt tri-oval, it was the 17th race of the 2011 Sprint Cup Series season. The race was won by David Ragan of Roush Fenway Racing, his first in the series. Ragan's teammate Matt Kenseth finished second and Joey Logano finished third.

Entry List

Report

Background

Daytona International Speedway is one of six  superspeedways to hold NASCAR races, the others being Michigan International Speedway, Auto Club Speedway, Indianapolis Motor Speedway, Pocono Raceway and Talladega Superspeedway. The track's turns are banked at 31 degrees, while the front stretch, the location of the finish line, is banked at 18 degrees. Kevin Harvick was the defending race winner.

Prior to the race, Carl Edwards led the Drivers' Championship with 573 points, and Harvick stood in second with 548 points. Jimmie Johnson was third in the Drivers' Championship with 540 points in a Chevrolet, Kurt Busch was fourth with 539 points, and Kyle Busch was in fifth with 536 points. In the Manufacturers' Championship, Chevrolet was leading with 108 points, 15 points ahead of Ford. Toyota, with 84 points, was 17 ahead of Dodge in the battle for third.

Practice and qualifying
Two practice sessions were scheduled before the race on Thursday. The sessions were scheduled to be 80 and 85 minutes long. However, because of wet weather the first practice session was cancelled, and the following session was shortened to 45 minutes long. In the only practice session for the race, Marcos Ambrose was the quickest with a time of 45.133 seconds.  A. J. Allmendinger followed in the second position, two hundredths of a second slower than Ambrose.  Kurt Busch was scored third ahead of Brad Keselowski, and  Mark Martin in fourth and fifth.

During qualifying, forty-five cars were entered, but only forty-three were able to race because of NASCAR's qualifying procedure. Martin clinched his 50th career pole position, with a time of 49.433. He was joined on the front row of the grid by 2011 Daytona 500 winner Trevor Bayne.  Clint Bowyer qualified third, Jeff Gordon took fourth, and David Ragan started fifth. The two drivers that failed to qualify were Tony Raines and J. J. Yeley.

Results

Qualifying

Race results

Standings after the race

References

Coke Zero 400
Coke Zero 400
NASCAR races at Daytona International Speedway
July 2011 sports events in the United States